Quotation is a reference to a previously known expression. 

Quotation can also refer to:

Quote 
 Financial quote, market data relating to a security or commodity
 Sales quote an offer price for goods or services
 See also Quote (disambiguation)

Quotation marks 

Meanings related to characters used for quotation are:
 Quotation mark, usage in English language
 International variation in quotation marks
 String literal in programming languages
 Quotation mark glyphs, various glyphs

Other uses
 Quotation (film), a 2004 Malayalam film